Pruszków railway station is a railway station in Pruszków, Poland.  The station is served by Koleje Mazowieckie, who run trains from Skierniewice to Warszawa Wschodnia, Przewozy Regionalne, who run some services from Warszawa Wschodnia and Rzeszów Główny via Pruszków and by Szybka Kolej Miejska, who operate line S1 which begins at this station, runs on the suburban tracks of the Cross City Line and goes on to Otwock, terminating there.

References
Station article at kolej.one.pl

External links 
 

Railway stations in Poland opened in 1845
Railway stations in Masovian Voivodeship
Railway stations served by Koleje Mazowieckie
Railway stations served by Szybka Kolej Miejska (Warsaw)
Railway station
Railway stations served by Przewozy Regionalne InterRegio